The Marvel Cinematic Universe is a media franchise and shared universe that is the setting of superhero films produced by Marvel Studios, based on characters that appear in Marvel Comics publications. Phases One, Two, and Three, were known as "The Infinity Saga", featuring many franchises and their sequels, and the first four Avengers crossover films. Phase Four is intended to feature four sequels to earlier films and three new film properties, with Phase Five set to include four sequels and two new properties, and Phase Six intended to feature two sequels and two new properties, including the fifth and sixth Avengers films. Phases Four, Five, and Six comprise "The Multiverse Saga".

As the franchise is composed of films adapted from a variety of Marvel Comics properties, there are multiple lead actors. Chris Hemsworth headlined as Thor in the Thor films in the Infinity Saga and again in Thor: Love and Thunder (2022); Chris Pratt portrays the lead character, Peter Quill / Star-Lord, in the Guardians of the Galaxy films and will return for its sequel Guardians of the Galaxy Vol. 3 (2023) and joined Hemsworth in Thor: Love and Thunder; Paul Rudd stars as Scott Lang / Ant-Man and Evangeline Lilly co-stars as Hope van Dyne / Wasp in the Ant-Man films, with both actors returning for Ant-Man and the Wasp: Quantumania (2023); Benedict Cumberbatch portrays Stephen Strange and appears again in Doctor Strange in the Multiverse of Madness (2022); Tom Holland portrays Peter Parker / Spider-Man in the Spider-Man films and returns in Spider-Man: No Way Home (2021) where he is joined by Cumberbatch; and Brie Larson portrays Carol Danvers / Captain Marvel and will appear again in The Marvels (2023), along with Iman Vellani as Kamala Khan / Ms. Marvel and Teyonah Parris as Monica Rambeau.

After appearing in supporting roles in the Infinity Saga, Scarlett Johansson stars as Natasha Romanoff / Black Widow in Black Widow (2021), Letitia Wright stars as Shuri / Black Panther in Black Panther: Wakanda Forever (2022), Anthony Mackie will headline Captain America: New World Order (2024) as Sam Wilson / Captain America, Sebastian Stan will lead the ensemble film Thunderbolts (2024) as Bucky Barnes, and Don Cheadle will star as James Rhodes / War Machine in Armor Wars. Simu Liu stars as Shang-Chi in Shang-Chi and the Legend of the Ten Rings (2021), while Gemma Chan headlines as Sersi in the ensemble film Eternals (2021). Mahershala Ali is set to headline Blade (2024) as Blade and Ryan Reynolds is set to star in Deadpool 3 (2024) as Wade Wilson / Deadpool.

Multiple other cast members recur across multiple films and series within the franchise. The list below is sorted by film and the character's surname, as some characters have been portrayed by multiple actors. All characters that have made appearances in other MCU media, such as the short films, television series, or digital series, are noted.

The Infinity Saga 

Phase One of the franchise includes six films, featuring four different superhero properties, leading up to a crossover in the 2012 film Marvel's The Avengers. The franchise's Phase Two features three sequels to Phase One films, as well as two new film properties, and the crossover Avengers: Age of Ultron, which released in 2015. Phase Three features four sequels to earlier films, and four new film properties, as well as the crossover films Avengers: Infinity War (2018) and Avengers: Endgame (2019). The films from Phase One through Phase Three are collectively known as "The Infinity Saga".

The Infinity Saga saw multiple lead actors: Robert Downey Jr. stars as Tony Stark / Iron Man; Edward Norton headlined The Incredible Hulk (2008), playing Bruce Banner / Hulk, but did not reprise the role in the future films, being replaced by Mark Ruffalo for all subsequent films involving the character; Chris Evans portrays Steve Rogers / Captain America; Chris Hemsworth plays Thor; Chris Pratt portrays Peter Quill / Star-Lord; Paul Rudd co-stars as Scott Lang / Ant-Man with Evangeline Lilly as Hope van Dyne / Wasp; Benedict Cumberbatch portrays Stephen Strange; Tom Holland portrays Peter Parker / Spider-Man; Chadwick Boseman portrayed T'Challa / Black Panther; and Brie Larson portrays Carol Danvers / Captain Marvel.

Samuel L. Jackson had cameo and supporting appearances as Nick Fury in several of the early films in the franchise, before co-starring in The Avengers; he would continue to have supporting roles in later films as well. Multiple other cast members recur across multiple films within the saga.

The Multiverse Saga

Phase Four

Phase Five

Phase Six

Future

See also 
Marvel One-Shot actors
Marvel Studios television series actors
WHIH Newsfront actors
The Daily Bugle actors
Marvel Television series actors
Stan Lee cameos

Notes

References

External links

Phase Four films 
Full cast and crew for Black Widow at IMDb
Full cast and crew for Shang-Chi and the Legend of the Ten Rings at IMDb
Full cast and crew for Eternals at IMDb
Full cast and crew for Spider-Man: No Way Home at IMDb
Full cast and crew for Doctor Strange in the Multiverse of Madness at IMDb
Full cast and crew for Thor: Love and Thunder at IMDb
Full cast and crew for Black Panther: Wakanda Forever at IMDb

Phase Five films 
Full cast and crew for Ant-Man and the Wasp: Quantumania at IMDb
Full cast and crew for Guardians of the Galaxy Vol. 3 at IMDb
Full cast and crew for The Marvels at IMDb
Full cast and crew for Blade at IMDb

Lists of actors by film series

Film actors